Quanzhou Yassin Football Club is a professional Chinese football club that currently participates in the China League Two. The team is based in Quanzhou, Fujian.

History
Quanzhou Addarmour F.C. was founded on 8 March 2019. The club participated in Chinese Champions League in 2020 and was promoted to China League Two. In 2021, the club changed its name to Quanzhou Yassin F.C.

Name history
2019–2020 Quanzhou Addarmour F.C. 泉州爱德马
2021– Quanzhou Yassin F.C. 泉州亚新

Players

Current squad

References

External links
Soccerway

Quanzhou Yassin F.C.
Association football clubs established in 2019
Sport in Fujian
2019 establishments in China